was a Japanese politician and business man. In 1930 he became the president of Sumitomo Group. During his period as president the company developed into a zaibatsu. The Ogura family served as retainers for the Nishio Clan which held possession of the Kanazawa Domain. Ogura joined the company in 1899 at the age of 24. He is credited for streamlining management for the company. In 1941 he was appointed Minister of Finance for the brief period between 18 July 1941 and 18 October 1941 in Fumimaro Konoe's third cabinet.

References

External links

 
  

1875 births
1961 deaths
Japanese businesspeople
People from Kanazawa, Ishikawa
Ministers of Finance of Japan
Government ministers of Japan